Parliamentary elections will be held in Mauritania on 13 and 27 May 2023, alongside regional and local elections.

The elections will be the first parliamentary elections held after the first peaceful transition of power in the country as a result of the 2019 presidential elections, in which Mohamed Ould Ghazouani was elected president after incumbent Mohamed Ould Abdel Aziz was not able to run due to the two-term constitutional limit.

Background
The previous parliamentary elections in 2018 saw the incumbent Union for the Republic (UPR) re-elected with an absolute majority, forming a coalition government with the Union for Democracy and Progress (UDP) with support of parties from the presidential majority, giving the UPR a comfortable majority in the National Assembly.

After the elections, 76 parties from both the presidential majority and opposition camps were dissolved for not obtaining more than 1% or not participating in two consecutive local elections, based on an election law passed the year before, with only 28 parties left registered.

Mohamed Ould Ghazouani from the UPR was elected president in the 2019 presidential elections, leading to the first peaceful transition of power in the country. Ghazouani quickly distanced himself from outgoing president Mohamed Ould Abdel Aziz, a divide that was made effective when Sidi Mohamed Ould Taleb Omar was elected president of the UPR, with Ould Abdel Aziz leaving the party. Ould Abdel Aziz was subsequently charged with "corruption, money laundering, illicit enrichment and abuse of influence" by the Public Prosecutor in March 2021 and referred to court in June 2022. He had been jailed in June 2021, until a bail was granted in January 2022 over health concerns.

After the split between Ghazouani and Aziz, the parties of the presidential majority reaffirmed their support to Ghazouani when creating the Coordination of Parties of the Majority in April 2021, as the new alliance gathering the parties of the presidential majority heavily criticized the legacy of the former president.

Four major political parties merged into the Union for the Republic. On 18 October 2018, a month after the previous parliamentary elections, the Unionist Party for the Construction of Mauritania (PUCM) voted to merge into the UPR. On 21 October Choura for Development made the same decision, while centrist El Wiam, a moderate opposition party, did the same on 29 October. The last party to merge into the UPR was the National Pact for Democracy and Development (PNDD-ADIL), which was the ruling party from 2007 until the 2008 coup. PNDD-ADIL merged into the UPR on 27 December 2019.

During the legislative term there were several cabinet reshuffles, the first one due to ministers appearing in papers from a parliamentary commission investigating corruption during the Aziz era, leading to the fall of Ismail Ould Bedde Ould Cheikh Sidiya's government in August 2020 and Mohamed Ould Bilal becoming the new PM. The second one was in May 2021 in order to restructure several ministries. The third one was in March–April 2022 after the resignation of Prime Minister Mohamed Ould Bilal, who was re-appointed the following day with a new cabinet. The fourth and fifth ones were in September 2022, the first due to the government wanting to fit in former PM Moulaye Ould Mohamed Laghdaf since he was seen as more capable of negotiating with the opposition and helping the government win the next elections, with the second one happening two weeks later.

On 26 September 2022 an agreement between the Ministry of the Interior and Decentralisation and all political parties registered in Mauritania was reached in order to renew the Independent National Electoral Commission and hold the elections in the first semester of 2023, with parties justifying it due to climatic and logistical conditions.

Electoral system

On 26 September 2022 all Mauritanian political parties reached an agreement sponsored by the Ministry of Interior and Decentralisation to reform the election system ahead of the upcoming elections after weeks of meetings between all parties.

The 176 members (an increase of 17 members compared to 2018) of the National Assembly will be elected by two methods (with Mauritanians being able to cast four different votes in a parallel voting system); 125 are elected from single- or multi-member electoral districts based on the departments (or moughataas) that the country is subdivided in (which the exception of Nouakchott, which has been divided in three 7-seat constituencies for this election based on the three regions (or wilayas) the city is subdivided in instead of the single 18-seat constituency that was used in 2018), using either the two-round system or proportional representation; in single-member constituencies candidates require a majority of the vote to be elected in the first round and a plurality in the second round. In two-seat constituencies, voters vote for a party list (which must contain one man and one woman); if no list receives more than 50% of the vote in the first round, a second round is held, with the winning party taking both seats. In constituencies with three or more seats, closed list proportional representation is used, with seats allocated using the largest remainder method. For three-seat constituencies, party lists must include a female candidate in first or second on the list; for larger constituencies a zipper system is used, with alternate male and female candidates. 

It was planned for four seats to be elected by the diaspora, with this election being the first time Mauritanians in the diaspora would have been be able to directly elect their representatives. However, the new electoral law introducing this was struck down as unconstitutional by the Constitutional Council on 10 February 2023.

The remaining 51 seats are elected from three nationwide constituencies, also using closed list proportional representation: a 20-seat national list (which uses a zipper system), a 20-seat women's national list and a new 11-seat youth list (with two reserved for people with special needs), which also uses a zipper system to guarantee the representation of women.

"One vote" system
In November 2022 President Ould Ghazouani called the parties supporting him to support the introduction of a single ballot system in the election, reducing the number of ballots from four to one. It has been suggested that Ghazouani started to further push for this reform after ex-president Ould Abdel Aziz starting working on his election strategy, as the ruling party wants to ensure a victory in the upcoming elections.

Political analyst Abdellahi Ould Mohamed Lemine told Maghreb Voices that he believes that adopting this option in voting will cancel the current method of election, which relies on ability of voters in choosing different parties per ballot (national lists and constituency), and that such reform would benefit the largest parties, especially El Insaf, which is capable of fielding candidates in all constituencies. This reform would also open the door to further disputes between the government and the opposition, which strongly opposed this method.

Tewassoul called on political parties to coordinate to stand up to "the circumvention of the agreement", expressing their surprised at "the recent confusion about issues that were decided by the agreement", in reference to the "one vote" system. The party's spokesperson, Salek Ould Sidi Mahmoud, affirmed that he considers the issue as "an indication that does not encourage confidence in the government's commitment to the [election reform] agreement" and said that "the proposal to unify the card was put forward under the pretext of reducing the void cards, but it is a fact that greatly limits the voter’s freedom of choice".

On 16 February 2023, the National Independent Election Commission and the political parties agreed to ditch the idea of a unified ballot, deciding to keep the ballot design as it was.

Parliamentary composition
The table below shows the composition of the parliamentary groups in the chamber when the National Assembly was dissolved on 13 March 2023.

Parties and alliances

The table below lists parties with parliamentary representation in the 9th National Assembly, as of July 2022.

In July 2022 the UPR rebranded itself as the Equity Party (El Insaf), electing Minister of Education and government spokesperson Mohamed Melainine Ould Eyih as president of the party, with him leaving the cabinet shortly after in order to focus on leading the party.

On 5 October 2022 the Union for Planning and Construction (UPC), until then a member of the Coordination of Parties of the Majority, decided to form a coalition with four political movements that were not allowed to be registered as political parties, forming the State of Justice Coalition, which would run under the UPC party label.

By November 2022 there were rumours of a very likely alliance between the Union of the Forces of Progress (UFP) and the Rally of Democratic Forces (RFD), at least for the 2024 presidential election. Both parties share a parliamentary group in the National Assembly and RFD endorsed Ould Maouloud, leader of UFP, in the previous presidential election.

An alliance between the Alliance for Justice and Democracy/Movement for Renewal (AJD/MR), the unregistered parties Progressive Forces of Change (FPC, successor of the African Liberation Forces of Mauritania paramilitary) and the Radical Party for a Global Action (RAG) of Biram Dah Abeid, parties that are self-declared representatives of the interests of Haratine and Black minorities of Mauritania, was also rumoured but was deemed as unlikely. AJD/MR and FPC are currently allied in the Coalition Living Together/Truth and Reconciliation (CVE/VR), while RAG is allied with Ba'athist Sawab.

On 13 November 2022, the ex-president Mohamed Ould Abdel Aziz announced in Paris the creation of a "platform for consultation and monitoring" between his own party, the National Cohesion for Rights and the Construction of Generations (CNDCG), and FLAM under the motto "Engaged for a United Mauritania". The platform, deemed "controversial", was not signed by the legal successors of the Black liberation paramilitary, but by a separate group. FLAM's leadership rejected the agreement, with El Insaf also condemning it and qualifying it as "reckless".

On 22 December 2022, Hope Mauritania was presented as a left-leaning opposition alliance which was joined by several major politicians, including ex-MP Kadiata Malick Diallo (ex-UFP) and MPs Mohamed Lemine Ould Sidi Maouloud (ex-Choura) and Elid Ould Mohameden (RFD).

On 25 December 2022, Tewassoul chose MP for Kiffa Hamadi Ould Sidi Mokhtar as the new party leader, replacing Mohamed Mahmoud Ould Seyidi.

On 15 March 2023, Tewassoul and the Coalition Living Together announced that they would present shared lists "according to arrangements agreed upon and in designated areas", with them announcing their desire to "create the widest possible alliance with all the national forces that believe in change", calling for a big tent opposition coalition.

Timetable
The key dates are listed below (all times are GMT):
 27 January: Start of the Electoral Census (RAVEL).
 27 February: End of the Electoral Census (RAVEL).
 28 February: Convocation of the electoral college.
 28 April: Official start of electoral campaigning.
 13 May: Polling day (first round). Polling stations open at 7 AM and close at 7 PM.
 27 May: Polling day (second round). Polling stations open at 7 AM and close at 7 PM.

An alternative calendar was considered by the National Independent Election Commission (CENI) but was abandoned because the end dates of the campaign and the first round would coincide with the end of Ramadan and Eid al-Fitr.

 6 February: Convocation of the electoral college.
 7 April: Official start of electoral campaigning.
 22 April: Polling day (first round).
 6 May: Polling day (second round).

Opinion polls

Notes

References

Mauritania
Parliamentary
Elections in Mauritania
Mauritania